August von Othegraven (2 June 1864 in Cologne – 11 March 1946 in Wermelskirchen) was a German composer and music pedagogue.

He worked as a professor of choral singing at the Cologne Musikhochschule. Amongst his pupils were Theodor Schwake and Herbert Eimert. The "August von Othegraven Plakette" named after him is bestowed as a medal and badge in bronze, silver, and gold, for services to the cultural care and promotion of choral singing.

Sources
Voss, Bert. August von Othegraven: Leben und Werke. Beiträge zur rheinischen Musikgeschichte  49. Cologne: Arno Volk Verlag, 1961.

1864 births
1946 deaths
German male composers
German composers
Academic staff of the Hochschule für Musik und Tanz Köln
Musicians from Cologne
People from the Rhine Province